Alyar may refer to:
 Əliyar, Azerbaijan
 Aliar (disambiguation)